Fabrizio Germán Angileri (born 15 March 1994) is an Argentine professional footballer who plays as a midfielder for La Liga club Getafe.

Club career

Early years
Angileri joined local club Escuela Deportiva Junín at the age of six, but soon thereafter joined San Martín de Mendoza. At age 12, he made the move to Buenos Aires and joined the youth ranks of Primera División club Boca Juniors. After two years, he moved back to San Martín de Mendoza, where he remained until he signed with Godoy Cruz when he was 17.

Godoy Cruz 
With his idol Martín Palermo as manager, Angileri made his professional debut in the Primera División during a matchup against All Boys on 9 February 2013. He was a 63rd-minute substitute during a 1–1 draw, coming on for Gonzalo Castellani. In his first three seasons (2012–13, 2013–14 and 2014), he made only 15 appearances. He was even called down to the reserve team during part of the 2014 season, scoring 18 goals while playing as a striker.

Gabriel Heinze, manager at the time, started to recognize him as the club's most improved player. His replacement, Daniel Oldrá, finally put him into the starting rotation during the 2015 season. He made 15 appearances that year, all but two as a starter. He also scored his first career goal on 4 October in a 3–0 win over Temperley, and added one the following game against Atletico Rafaela.

River Plate 
In March 2019, he joined River Plate on loan until December 2019.

Getafe
On 14 July 2022, Angileri signed for La Liga side Getafe on a four-year deal.

Career statistics

References

External links

 Fabrizio Angileri at Getafe CF website
 

Living people
1994 births
Sportspeople from Mendoza Province
Argentine footballers
Association football midfielders
Godoy Cruz Antonio Tomba footballers
Club Atlético River Plate footballers
Getafe CF footballers
Argentine Primera División players
La Liga players
Argentine expatriate footballers
Argentine expatriate sportspeople in Spain
Expatriate footballers in Spain